Mount Richards is a 2,377-meter-elevation (7,799-foot) mountain summit located in Waterton Lakes National Park, in the Canadian Rockies of Alberta, Canada. It is situated just north of the Canada–United States border, with the south footing of the mountain at Boundary Creek just within Glacier National Park of the United States. Its nearest higher peak is Mount Alderson,  to the northwest. Bertha Lake and Bertha Peak are situated immediately to the north.

History

Mount Richards was named in honor of Admiral Sir George Henry Richards (1820–1896), Hydrographer of the Navy who was the Second Commissioner of the British Boundary Commission which delineated the border from the Pacific to the Rockies. It has also been called Sleeping Indian Mountain. The mountain's toponym was officially adopted in 1943 by the Geographical Names Board of Canada.

Geology

Like other mountains in Waterton Lakes National Park, Mount Richards is composed of sedimentary rock laid down during the Precambrian to Jurassic periods. Formed in shallow seas, this sedimentary rock was pushed east and over the top of younger Cretaceous period rock during the Laramide orogeny.

Climate

Based on the Köppen climate classification, Mount Richards is located in a subarctic climate zone with cold, snowy winters, and mild summers. Winter temperatures can drop below −20 °C with wind chill factors below −30 °C. Precipitation runoff from Mount Richards drains into Waterton Lake, thence Waterton River.

Gallery

See also

Geography of Alberta

References

External links

 Mount Richards weather forecast
 Parks Canada web site: Waterton Lakes National Park

Two-thousanders of Alberta
Waterton Lakes National Park
Alberta's Rockies
Canadian Rockies